Peng Cheng-min, (born 6 August 1978 in Kaoshiung, Taiwan), is a Taiwanese former baseball player and baseball coach who previously played right fielder, first base and designated hitter for the CTBC Brothers of the Chinese Professional Baseball League from 2001 to 2019.

Career
During the 2001–02 seasons he was designated hitter for the team, as he was picked 1st overall in the 2001 draft. Starting in 2003, he began his four-season tenure in right field after adjusting to the role. However, in the middle of the 2006 season Brother Elephants released then first baseman Tsai Feng-an (蔡豐安) and Peng switched to play first base, late in his career, he also played as an occasional designated hitter. He also wore number 23 because his original number 6 jersey was worn by Tsai when he first entered the team, but he never reverted to the number, as there had been no notable players who wore number 23 in baseball.

He is known for his skill hitting inside-out, so he always lands the ball on the right side of the field, that falsely listed him as an opposite-field hitter. He has won five CPBL Batting Championship Awards and holds the Chinese Professional Baseball League records for career Singles(1515), walks (1126), and runs scored (1090). he was the pivotal and the only member of both generations of Three Slugging Muketeers.

However, in 2005, he had an incident similar to David Ortiz, where he hit a power box out of frustration. That caused him to inflict multiple fractures on his wrist. He missed the 2005 calendar year, and the top half of 2006 season. The break included all of the international fixtures, including Intercontinental Cup 2006.

In 2008, he hit .391, a CPBL single-season record.(Then it was broken by Wang Po-jung with .414 in 2016) On 20 September 2008, Peng hit the 1000th home run in Elephant's history, and followed it up on 28 March 2009 with the CPBL's 6000th home run. He recorded his career 1,000 hits on 18 August 2010 in Taichung Baseball Field, becoming the player reached the 1,000 hits with fewest games(844), plates (3469), at bats (2838).

In the end of 2010, when the Brother Elephants seized the championship, he gained the CPBL MVP of the Year Award, adding to the one earned in 2001, and also adding to his three consecutive titles.

On 21 November 2011, Peng signed a ten-year extension with the Brother Elephants, five-year as player and five-year as coach. The contract worth 66 million NT dollar (roughly 2.27 million US dollar), it is the largest contract for a player in CPBL history.

Since 2012, however, he was no longer a regular starter. After becoming the 4th player in CPBL history to reach 1000 hits, 100 home runs and 100 steals landmark, it wasn't until 4 May 2014, where he made his 200th stolen base, and made hit 2000th base hit on 7 July 2019. 10 days later, he became the highest ever run scorer, 1076 runs scored.

In January 2019, Peng announced his retirement from baseball, and will play his final match on 29 September as a testimonial match, with his jersey number likely to be retired at the conclusion of the match. During the final week, all team members wore the jersey with 'Chia, 23' on their back. His actual final match was in the Final when the team lost 3-20, which incidentally adds to 23, his shirt number.

He became an assistant batting coach for Chinese Taipei National Team in October, 2019.

Chia Chia (恰恰) is Peng's nickname as he shares the surname and bears resemblance to Peng Chia-chia, a veteran Taiwanese entertainer and baseball fanatic.

Experience
 Kaoshiung City Municipal Fu-sing Elememtary School Baseball Team
 Kaoshiung City Municipal Wu-fu Junior High School Baseball Team
 Pintong Mei-he High School Baseball Team, trained as second baseman and third baseman, but excelled as a shortstop.
 Taiwan Cooperative Bank baseball team
 Taiwan Army Baseball Team, as a positional pitcher, armed with a 144 km/h fastball
 CPBL Brother Elephants/Chinatrust Brother Elephants (2001~2019), 
 4-time CPBL champion, 2001–2003, 2010 playoffs MVP, 2001, 2010, Golden Hammer Team, 2002, 2010 Regular Season League MVP
 Franchise-matching 7-time runner-up (2014-2017, 2019)
 Oldest ever league finals LMVP (losing team, 2016)
 First ever player winning 5-time Batting Average Titles, 2003–2005, 2008, 2010 with .376 in 2004, a CPBL record for Taiwanese-born local players. Eclipsed by himself in 2008 (.391).
 Chinese Taipei National Baseball Team (2001-2013)

Career statistics

 is CPBL record

Career Statistics Rank

Awards

Salary

*1 NT dollar is roughly equal to 0.033 US dollar.

National team
He has been selected by Chinese Taipei baseball team several times since 1998, as follows:
 1998 Baseball World Cup
 2000 Haarlem Baseball Week
 2002 Busan Asian Games
 2002 Intercontinental Cup
 2003 Asian Baseball Championship
 2004 Athens Olympic Games
 2007 Baseball World Cup
 2007 Asian Baseball Championship
 2008 Summer Olympics – Qualification
 2008 Beijing Olympic Games
 2009 World Baseball Classic
 2010 Guangzhou Asian Games
 2013 World Baseball Classic - Qualification
 2013 World Baseball Classic

International game performance
On 2 March 2013, Peng played for Chinese Taipei national baseball team against Australia in Taichung Intercontinental Baseball Stadium during 2013 World Baseball Classic. In the first inning, he drove Dai-Kang Yang for first run of the tournament; besides, in the fifth inning, he smashed a right-field solo home run, it was first home run of the tournament.

Family
Peng's parents live in Kaoshiung; in addition, he has two elder sisters and a younger brother, Peng Cheng-sin(彭政欣), who currently is a Chinatrust Brothers administrator. On 13 December 2008, he married Lu Kuan-chi(呂冠綺), a flight attendant. Then, they gave birth to twins, a boy and a girl.

References

External links
 

1978 births
Living people
Asian Games medalists in baseball
Asian Games silver medalists for Chinese Taipei
Baseball players at the 2002 Asian Games
Baseball players at the 2004 Summer Olympics
Baseball players at the 2008 Summer Olympics
Baseball players at the 2010 Asian Games
Brother Elephants players
Medalists at the 2002 Asian Games
Medalists at the 2010 Asian Games
Olympic baseball players of Taiwan
Baseball players from Kaohsiung
2009 World Baseball Classic players
2013 World Baseball Classic players